Alexander Caskey (born July 22, 1988) is a former American soccer player.

Career

College and amateur
Caskey played college soccer at Davidson College for four seasons where he was a three-time All-Southern Conference first team selection and a two-time NSCAA All-South Region second team selection.  He was twice selected to the North Carolina Collegiate Sports Information Association All-State first team.   A two-year team captain,  Caskey finished his Davidson career with 19 goals and 15 assists for 53 points and did not miss a single match, starting all 76.     He was also named to the  Soccer America and College Soccer News national Teams of the Week and was a Southern Conference Player of the month and of the week.

Caskey also spent 2 seasons with the Atlanta Blackhawks of the USL Premier Development League.

Professional
On January 13, 2011, Caskey was drafted in the third round (47th overall) by Seattle Sounders FC in the 2011 MLS SuperDraft. He was later cut on January 31, 2011, before training season.

Caskey signed with Charleston Battery of the USL Pro league on March 29, 2011, and made his professional debut on April 9 in a game against the Charlotte Eagles.  He scored his first goal as a professional, a game-winning header, on July 9, 2011.

Caskey signed with Seattle Sounders FC on March 13, 2012, getting his first start on April 14 against the Colorado Rapids. He scored his first goal in a 4-0 rout of the LA Galaxy.

He was traded to D.C. United in March 2014 in exchange for a third-round pick in the 2016 MLS SuperDraft.

After the 2014 season, Caskey was released by D.C. United.

Career statistics

References

External links
 
 Davidson Wildcats bio
 Caskey 2010 Season Highlights

1988 births
Living people
American soccer players
Davidson Wildcats men's soccer players
Atlanta Blackhawks players
Charleston Battery players
Seattle Sounders FC players
D.C. United players
People from Dunwoody, Georgia
Richmond Kickers players
Soccer players from Georgia (U.S. state)
Sportspeople from DeKalb County, Georgia
Seattle Sounders FC draft picks
USL League Two players
Major League Soccer players
Association football midfielders
Dunwoody High School alumni